Marko Andrés Biskupović Venturino (born 30 June 1989) is a Chilean former footballer who played as a defender.

International career
On 2012, he represented Chile in two matches against Peru. After winning both, Chile got the Copa del Pacífico.

Personal life
At the same time he was a footballer, he got a Master's degree in Big Data applied to the football in the Universidad Católica of Murcia and a Bachelor's degree in Sport Management at the University College of Northern Denmark. In addition, he took courses of Sports Data Analytics at the Johan Cruyff Institute, Performance Analytics at the CONMEBOL and Football Clubs Management at the University of Palermo.

He is married to Javiera Naranjo, a sports journalist who worked for Canal del Fútbol.

Honours

Club
Universidad Católica
 Copa Chile (1): 2011

International
Chile
 Copa del Pacífico (1): 2012

Post retirement
Immediately to his retirement from football, in 2022 he joined Football Federation of Chile to work as Head of Identification (ID), Scouting and Analytics of Chilean players around the world.

References

External links
UC profile	

1989 births
Living people
footballers from Santiago
Chilean footballers
Chile international footballers
Chilean expatriate footballers
Chilean people of Croatian descent
Chilean people of Italian descent
Chilean Primera División players
Primera B de Chile players
Club Deportivo Universidad Católica footballers
Puerto Montt footballers
Unión La Calera footballers
Deportes La Serena footballers
Deportes Magallanes footballers
Magallanes footballers
Allsvenskan players
Kalmar FF players
Expatriate footballers in Sweden
Chilean expatriate sportspeople in Sweden
Association football defenders